Emu Point is a north-eastern suburb of Albany in southern Western Australia north-east of Albany's central business district. Its local government area is the City of Albany.

It was gazetted as a suburb in 1979.

Geography 

The suburb is bounded in the north-east by Oyster Harbour, to the east and south-east by King George Sound, to the north by Yakamia Creek and in the west by Lower King Road.

The suburb is named after the beach and park found within its boundaries. As at the 2011 census, it had a median age of 68.

References

Suburbs of Albany, Western Australia
King George Sound